Edward Harley (7 June 1664 – 30 August 1735) was a British Tory politician. He sat as Member of Parliament for twenty seven years supporting the group led by his brother, Robert Harley.  He was also Auditor of the Imprests. Because of this, and to distinguish him from other family members of the same name, is frequently known as Auditor Harley.

Career
He was second son of Edward Harley of Brampton Bryan, Herefordshire and the younger brother of Robert Harley, 1st Earl of Oxford and Earl Mortimer. He was educated at Westminster School and the Middle Temple (1681), where he was called to the bar in 1688.

He represented Droitwich in Parliament from 1695 to 1698, after which he was a member for Leominster, almost continuously until 1722. He was appointed Recorder of Leominster for 1692-1732 and joint Auditor of the Imprests for life in 1702. He was a solid supporter of his brother's government from 1710 to 1714. He strongly opposed the 1715 measure in the Commons to have Harley impeached, but this was unsuccessful and his brother was imprisoned in the Tower of London for two years.

He purchased the Eywood estate at Titley, Herefordshire and there around 1705 built a new house, which was demolished in 1958.

Family
He married Sarah Foley, third daughter of Thomas Foley.  Their eldest son (Edward) succeeded as 3rd Earl of Oxford on the death of his brother Robert's son Edward, the 2nd earl, without male issue.  Their second son Robert died in infancy, after which came a daughter named Abigail and finally another son Robert Harley, Recorder of Leominster and twice Member of Parliament for that town.

Sources

thepeerage.com

Burke's Peerage (1851 edition).
 Sarah Harley funerary monument, Brampton Bryan church, Herefordshire.

Bibliography
 Rogers, Pat. The Life and Times of Thomas, Lord Coningsby: The Whig Hangman and his Victims. A&C Black, 2011.

|-

1664 births
1735 deaths
People from Herefordshire
Edward
People educated at Westminster School, London
Members of the Middle Temple
Members of the Parliament of Great Britain for English constituencies
English MPs 1695–1698
English MPs 1698–1700
English MPs 1701
English MPs 1701–1702
English MPs 1702–1705
English MPs 1705–1707
British MPs 1707–1708
British MPs 1708–1710
British MPs 1710–1713
British MPs 1713–1715
British MPs 1715–1722